"Love Is Here to Stay" is a popular song and jazz standard composed by George Gershwin with lyrics by Ira Gershwin for the movie The Goldwyn Follies (1938).

History 
"Love Is Here to Stay" was first performed by Kenny Baker in The Goldwyn Follies but became popular when it was sung by Gene Kelly to Leslie Caron in the film An American in Paris (1951). The song appeared in Forget Paris (1995) and Manhattan (1979). It can also be heard in the film When Harry Met Sally... (1989) sung by Harry Connick Jr.

An instrumental version of the song is heard in an episode of TV's The Honeymooners when Alice turns to Ralph and says: "I loved you ever since the day I walked in your bus and you shortchanged me."

The song is also used in the musical The 1940's Radio Hour; however, it was not included in the 2015 Broadway musical An American in Paris.

Composition 
"Love Is Here to Stay" was the last musical composition George Gershwin completed before his death on July 11, 1937. Ira Gershwin wrote the lyrics after George's death as a tribute to his brother. Although George had not written a verse for the song, he did have an idea for it that both Ira and pianist Oscar Levant had heard before his death. When a verse was needed, Ira and Levant recalled what George had in mind. Composer Vernon Duke reconstructed the music for the verse at the beginning of the song. Originally titled "It's Here to Stay" and then "Our Love Is Here to Stay," the song was finally published as "Love Is Here to Stay." Ira Gershwin said that for years he wanted to change the song's name back to "Our Love Is Here to Stay," but he felt it wouldn't be right since the song had already become a standard.

The Goldwyn Follies 
Ira Gershwin recalled, "So little footage was given to 'Love Is Here to Stay' — I think only one refrain — that it meant little in The Goldwyn Follies." Oscar Levant remembers the producer for the film calling Gershwin into a conference one afternoon and insisting that he play the entire score for a panel of attendees. The experience infuriated George, who thought that he had progressed past this stage in his career as a composer. S. N. Behrman visited Gershwin a few days before he died and wrote that George told him, "I had to live for this — that Sam Goldwyn should say to me, 'Why don't you write hits like Irving Berlin?' "

Other versions
 Frank Sinatra - Songs For Swingin' Lovers (1956)
 Ella Fitzgerald and Louis Armstrong – Ella and Louis Again (1957)
 Ella Fitzgerald – Ella Fitzgerald Sings the George and Ira Gershwin Songbook (1959)
 Billie Holiday – All or Nothing at All (1959)
 Susannah McCorkle – Hearts and Minds (2000)
 Red Norvo with Mildred Bailey – (1938)
 Dinah Washington – In the Land of Hi-Fi (1956)
 Bradley Walsh – Chasing Dreams (2016)
 Pat Boone and Shirley Boone – I Love You Truly (1962)
 Nat 'King' Cole – Sings For Two In Love (1953)
 Alan Sherman did a parody of the song as "Your Mother's Here to Stay" from the album "For Swing'in Livers Only".(1964)

See also
List of 1930s jazz standards

References 

1938 songs
1930s jazz standards
Songs with music by George Gershwin
Songs with lyrics by Ira Gershwin
Jazz compositions in E-flat major
Chris Montez songs
Pop standards
Songs written for films